The 2010 Boston College Eagles football team represented Boston College in the 2010 NCAA Division I FBS football season. The Eagles were led by second-year head coach Frank Spaziani and played their home games at Alumni Stadium in Chestnut Hill, Massachusetts. They were members of the Atlantic Coast Conference (ACC) in the Atlantic Division and were invited to Kraft Fight Hunger Bowl, where they lost to Nevada, 20–13. They finished the season 7–6 overall and 4–4 in ACC play.

Schedule

2011 NFL draftees

References

Boston College
Boston College Eagles football seasons
Boston College Eagles football
Boston College Eagles football